Panchylissus is a genus of beetles in the family Cerambycidae, containing the following species:

 Panchylissus cyaneipennis Waterhouse, 1880
 Panchylissus nigriventris Lane, 1965

References

Trachyderini